The 2023 Kano State gubernatorial election will take place on 18 March 2023, to elect the Governor of Kano State, concurrent with elections to the Kano State House of Assembly as well as twenty-seven other gubernatorial elections and elections to all other state houses of assembly. The election—which was postponed from its original 11 March date—will be held three weeks after the presidential election and National Assembly elections. Incumbent APC Governor Abdullahi Umar Ganduje is term-limited and cannot seek re-election to a third term.

Party primaries were scheduled for between 4 April and 9 June 2022 with the All Progressives Congress nominating Deputy Governor Nasir Yusuf Gawuna on 26 May while the New Nigeria Peoples Party nominated former commissioner Abba Kabir Yusuf on 6 June. For the Peoples Democratic Party, two separate parallel primaries were held on 25 May with one primary nominating Mohammed Abacha—the son and bagman of former military dictator Sani Abacha—while the other primary picked former commissioner Sadiq Wali; about a month after the primaries, INEC recognized Abacha as the legitimate nominee but switched recognition to Wali by July. Recognition returned to Abacha in December due to the ruling of a Federal High Court, but returned to Wali due to a Court of Appeal judgment in February 2023.

Electoral system
The Governor of Kano State is elected using a modified two-round system. To be elected in the first round, a candidate must receive the plurality of the vote and over 25% of the vote in at least two-thirds of state local government areas. If no candidate passes this threshold, a second round will be held between the top candidate and the next candidate to have received a plurality of votes in the highest number of local government areas.

Background
Kano State is a highly populated northwestern state mainly inhabited by ethnic Hausas and Fulanis but with significant non-indigenous populations of Igbo, Yoruba, and other ethnicities. The state has a growing economy but is facing an underdeveloped agricultural sector, overcrowded urban areas, desertification, and relatively low education rates.

Politically, the state's 2019 elections were categorized as a reassertion of the APC's federal dominance after mass 2018 defections away from the party led by outgoing Senator Rabiu Musa Kwankwaso and his allies. The APC was mainly successful federally, unseating almost all PDP senators and house members to sweep most House of Representatives and all three senate seats as the state was easily won by APC presidential nominee Muhammadu Buhari with over 75% but still swung towards the PDP and had lower turnout. However, state level elections were much closer as Umar Ganduje needed a disputed supplementary election to barely beat the PDP's Abba Kabir Yusuf; the House of Assembly elections were also closer but the APC won a sizeable majority. During the 2019–2023 term, Kwankwaso's early 2022 party switch to the NNPP was followed by a swell in defections to the party with over a dozen House of Assembly members and several federal lawmakers defected from both the major parties to the NNPP, swiftly making it into the second largest party in Kano State.

Ahead of Umar Ganduje's second term, his administration stated focuses included water resource management, education, healthcare, agricultural development, combating drug abuse, rural development, and security. In terms of his performance, Umar Ganduje was praised for attempting to return out-of-school children to school, calling for restrictions on herding, and education policy. However, he faced criticism for his feud with the then-Emir of Kano Muhammadu Sanusi II which led to the sacking and illegal forced exile of the emir, briefly banning people of different sexes from riding the same commercial tricycles, downplaying the COVID-19 pandemic, alleged anti-Christian sentiment in the state government and infringements on constitutionally-mandated secularism, further corruption, a series of questionable awards he received in an attempt to rebuild his public image, and nepotism. Umar Ganduje also came over fire for his moves to silence journalists through attempting to interfere with media houses but most notably, when he threatened to "deal with" Jaafar Jaafar (the journalist who exposed videos of Umar Ganduje taking bribes during his first term) and eventually forced Jaafar into self-imposed exile.

Primary elections
The primaries, along with any potential challenges to primary results, were to take place between 4 April and 3 June 2022 but the deadline was extended to 9 June. According to some candidates and community leaders from the state's south, an informal zoning gentlemen's agreement sets the Kano South Senatorial District to have the next governor as since the 1999 return of democracy, all Kano governors have come from either the Kano Central or Kano North senatorial districts. However, no major party has yet closed their primaries to candidates from the central or northern regions.

All Progressives Congress 
Analysts view the APC gubernatorial primary as a likely battle between the preexisting major factions within the Kano State APC, namely: the faction led by outgoing Governor Abdullahi Umar Ganduje and the G-7 group, led by Kano Central Senator and former Governor Ibrahim Shekarau along with Kano North Senator Barau Jibrin. Tensions between the factions reached a head in late 2021 when Umar Ganduje's faction held a parallel party congress and elected separate leadership to the G-7 bloc's congress; courts first ruled that the results of the G-7 congress were legitimate before an appeal gave the legitimacy to Umar Ganduje's congress in February 2022. In the wake of the ruling in favour of Umar Ganduje's faction, analysts stated that the G-7 would either have to hope that the Supreme Court ruled in their favour (it ruled against them on 6 May), contest APC primaries under a hostile Ganduje-led Kano APC, or defect to other parties. The party crisis is notably dangerous as violence arose with a massive clash in July 2021 between supporters of Jibrin and Murtala Sule Garo, a commissioner close to Umar Ganduje, injuring dozens while Jibrin's campaign office was attacked and burnt down in December 2021. The intraparty violence then became deadly in March 2022 when four people were killed in clashes between supporters of Sule Garo and Kabiru Alhassan Rurum, another potential gubernatorial candidate.

Other than the factional crisis, fears of candidate imposition arose after state First Lady Hafsat Ganduje endorsed Sule Garo at an event in August 2021. Although the state government claimed she was recorded out of context, the video of the powerful first lady publicly backing a then-unannounced candidate nine months before the primary led to rumours that Governor Umar Ganduje himself was supporting Sule Garo as well. Sule Garo, who ransacked a collation centre in 2019 with Deputy Governor Nasir Yusuf Gawuna to force the election to inconclusiveness, is from Kano North like Umar Ganduje making his potential nomination angering for those supporting regional power rotation. However, by May 2022, reports emerged that Umar Ganduje would endorse Gawuna for governor with Sule Garo as his running mate. In reaction, House of Representatives member Kabiru Alhassan Rurum swiftly left the APC in protest of another non-southerner being poised to gain the party's nomination (Gawuna is from Kano Central). To stave off further outcry, the state APC stated that while Umar Ganduje and other major politicians had backed Gawuna, the party would hold an open and fair primary. Despite the statement, withdrawals continued as Jibrin opted to drop out and seek re-election to the Senate as A.A. Zaura also withdrew for a senatorial run. On the other hand, Sha'aban Ibrahim Sharada and Inuwa Ibrahim Waya vowed to continue their campaigns. Meanwhile, this occurred under the backdrop of more high-profile defections from the APC to the NNPP, largely (but not entirely) by politicians from Kano South who lamented their region's exclusion by the APC and by former G-7 supporters.

On the primary date, only Ibrahim Sharada contested against Gawuna in the indirect primary that ended with Gawuna emerging as the party nominee nearly unanimously. In his acceptance speech, Gawuna thanked the party leaders for their support and called for party members to unite. Ibrahim Sharada rejected the results and claimed that he narrowly escaped an assassination plot at the primary venue. He would go on to file a lawsuit against Gawuna in June, suing for the disqualification of Gawuna as a candidate. By August, Ibrahim Sharada joined ADP to gain its nomination.

Nominated 
 Nasir Yusuf Gawuna: Deputy Governor (2018–present), Commissioner for Agriculture and Natural Resources (2014–2018; 2019–2022), and Nasarawa Local Government Chairman (2003–2011)

Eliminated in primary 
 Sha'aban Ibrahim Sharada: House of Representatives member for Kano Municipal (2019–present) and former aide to President Muhammadu Buhari (defected after the primary to obtain the ADP nomination)

Withdrew 
 Alhaji Usman Alhaji: Secretary to the State Government (2016–present) and former Commissioner for Education (1999–2003)
 Kabiru Alhassan Rurum: House of Representatives member for Rano/Bunkure/Kibiya (2019–present), former House of Assembly member for Rano (2011–2019), and former Speaker of the House of Assembly (2015–2017; 2018–2019) (defected prior to the primary to the NNPP to run for re-election as MHR for Rano/Bunkure/Kibiya)
 Bashir Ishaq Bashir: engineer (defected after the primary to the LP)
 Barau Jibrin: Senator for Kano North (2015–present), former Commissioner of Science and Technology, and former House of Representatives member for Tarauni (1999–2003)(to run for re-election as senator for Kano North)
 Murtala Sule Garo: former Commissioner for Local Government and Community Development (2015–2022) and former Kabo Local Government Chairman (2014–2015)
 Inuwa Ibrahim Waya: former Nigerian National Petroleum Corporation official
 Abdulkarim Abdulsalam Zaura: 2019 GPN gubernatorial nominee (to run for senator for Kano South)

Declined 
 Umar Yakubu Danhassan: 2019 ADP gubernatorial nominee
 Kabiru Ibrahim Gaya: Senator for Kano South (2007–present) and former Governor (1992–1993)
 Salihu Sagir Takai: 2019 PRP gubernatorial nominee and PDP gubernatorial candidate, 2015 PDP gubernatorial nominee, 2011 ANPP gubernatorial nominee, former commissioner (2003–2010), and former Takai Local Government Chairman (1999–2002)

Results

New Nigeria Peoples Party 
In early 2022, former Governor Rabiu Musa Kwankwaso and many of his allies defected from the PDP to join the NNPP; while Kwankwaso is ineligible to run for a third term and is running for president, the PDP's 2019 gubernatorial nominee Abba Kabir Yusuf prepared to run for governor again. Some pundits claim that the NNPP has the potential to seriously contest against the major parties with the backing of Kwankwaso's Kwankwasiyya movement.

On 18 and 19 May, reports emerged that the party had settled on Yusuf as its consensus nominee with Aminu Abdussalam Gwarzo—who was Yusuf's PDP running mate in 2019—getting the deputy gubernatorial slot. This reporting was confirmed on 6 June, the day of the primary, when Yusuf won unopposed.

Nominated 
 Abba Kabir Yusuf: 2019 PDP gubernatorial nominee; former Commissioner of Works, Housing and Transport (2011–2015); and son-in-law of former Governor Rabiu Musa Kwankwaso

Declined 
 Abdullahi Baffa Bichi: former Executive Secretary of Tertiary Education Trust Fund

Results

People's Democratic Party 
The years prior to the PDP primaries were beset by party infighting between two different party factions, one backed by former minister Aminu Wali while the other was supported by former Governor Rabiu Musa Kwankwaso. However, in early 2022, Kwankwaso and many of his allies defected from the PDP to join the NNPP. As many members of Kwankwaso's Kwankwasiyya movement defected along with him, analysts state that the NNPP's rise has the potential to hurt the PDP in the general election. The defection also lead Wali to cement his partial control of the state party but he was challenged by the state executive previously aligned with Kwankwaso. The state executive and some candidates—who feared that if Wali gained full power over the party, he would impose his son (former commissioner Sadiq Wali) as the gubernatorial nominee—argued with Wali's faction and the national party over ward congresses diving the party into further crisis ahead of the primary.

On the primary date, two parallel primaries were held with Wali's grouping holding an indirect primary at the Sani Abacha Youth Center while the Sagagi faction held its primary at the state party headquarters. After both primaries were peacefully held, the Youth Center primary ended in a Sadiq Wali win while the direct primary resulted in a victory for Mohammed Abacha. The PDP National Working Committee delayed the transmission of the certificate of return to one of the victors in early June before INEC recognized the Abacha-won Sagagi factional primary at the end of June. However, in July, INEC listed Wali as the party's nominee; Abacha immediately sued to have the decision reversed. In December, a Federal High Court ruling ordered INEC to recognize Abacha as the nominee again; Wali vowed to appeal the judgment. His appeal succeeded, with the Court of Appeal siding with his case and ordering INEC to return recognition to Wali on 10 February 2023.

Nominated by the Sagagi factional primary 
 Mohammed Abacha: lawyer and son of former military dictator Sani Abacha

Nominated by the Wali factional primary 
 Sadiq Wali: former Commissioner for Water Resources (2019–2022), 2019 PDP gubernatorial candidate, and son of former Foreign Minister Aminu Wali

Eliminated in primaries 
 Muhammad Ibrahim Al-Amin Little: 2003 ANPP and PRP gubernatorial candidate
 Mustapha Bala Gesto: 2019 NPM gubernatorial nominee
 Jafar Sani Bello: 2019 PDP gubernatorial candidate
 Yusuf Bello Dambatta: former Commissioner for Land and Physical Planning (2014–2015), former Commissioner for Economic Planning and Budget (2011–2014), and former Commissioner for Finance (2011)
 Yunusa Adamu Dangwani: former Commissioner for Water Resources (2012–2015) and former Chief of Staff to Governor Rabiu Musa Kwankwaso (2011–2012)

Withdrew 
 Muazu Magaji: former Gas Pipeline Project Delivery and Gas Industrialisation Committee Chairman (2020–2021) and former Commissioner of Works (2019–2020)
 Muhuyi Magaji Rimin Gado: former Chairman of Kano Public Complaints and Anti-Corruption Commission (2015–2022) (to run for senator for Kano North)

Minor parties 

 Hamisu Santuraki (Action Alliance)
Running mate: Fatima Muhammad
 Sha'aban Ibrahim Sharada (Action Democratic Party)
Running mate: Rabiu Ahmad Bako
 Ibrahim Muhammad (Action Peoples Party)
Running mate: Aminu Sani Rogo
 Mahmud Sani (African Action Congress)
Running mate: Mustapha Idi Gaya
 Khalid Ibrahim Idris (African Democratic Congress)
Running mate: Aminu A. Anas
 Ibrahim Sani (Allied Peoples Movement)
Running mate: Aminu Garba Dantsho
 Umar Yakasai Sulenkuka (All Progressives Grand Alliance)
Running mate: Abdulsalam Gwarmai Hamisu
 Furera Ahmad Yakubu (Boot Party)
Running mate: Usman Garba Rano
 Mohammed Raji Abdullahi (Labour Party)
Running mate: Auwal Muhammad Falala
 Aishatu Mahmud (National Rescue Movement)
Running mate: Ismail Sammani
 Salihu Tanko Yakasai (People's Redemption Party)
Running mate: Shazali Muhammad
 Mohammed G. Bala (Social Democratic Party)
Running mate: Habiby Dundy Sabo
 Ahmed Isa Muhammad (Young Progressives Party)
Running mate: Yakubu Uba Muhammad
 Isa Nuhu (Zenith Labour Party)
Running mate: Mukaddas Adamu Yakubu
 Sheikh Ibrahim Khaleel (African Democratic Congress)
Running mate: Dr. Aminu Anass

Campaign
After the primaries, pundits focused on the continued internal issues of the three major parties, namely: the dispute over the legitimate PDP nominee, aggrieved members of the APC and some of their defections, and unease in the rising NNPP. For the PDP, INEC first recognized Mohammed Abacha as the nominee in June 2022 but switched recognition to Sadiq Wali the next month; Abacha promptly sued as pundits noted the unending state PDP crisis. Although defections from the APC abated compared to earlier in 2022 and Ganduje reconciled with some of his former intra-party opponents, other aggrieved party members continued to leave including MHR Sha'aban Ibrahim Sharada—runner-up in the APC gubernatorial primary—who departed for the ADP where he tussled for the party's gubernatorial nomination. Meanwhile, the newfound alliance between longtime rival former governors Rabiu Musa Kwankwaso and Ibrahim Shekarau in the NNPP quickly collapsed as Shekarau and his allies began publicly lamenting Kwankwaso's allegedly broken promises by early August. Attempts by Kwankwaso to salvage the alliance failed and Shekarau defect to the PDP at a rally with PDP presidential nominee Atiku Abubakar and other PDP figures on 29 August. The defection led to a situation where each of the state's three most prominent political godfathers (Ganduje, Kwankwaso, and Shekarau) are all in three different parties. While the national PDP focused on Shekarau's ability to help Abubakar's performance in the state, it was also noted that Shekarau could boost the party's gubernatorial performance if the crisis was resolved; a Shekarau aide claimed that he would work on party reconciliation.

In late October and early November, a new internal rift opened in the APC as the party's deputy gubernatorial nominee Murtala Sule Garo had a physical altercation with House of Representatives Majority Leader Alhassan Doguwa during a meeting at Gawuna's house. Pundits quickly noted that renewed feuding in the Kano APC could completely derail the party's prospects in the state. Not only did both politicians publicly demand apologies, Doguwa accused Sule Garo of tacitly supporting PDP presidential nominee Atiku Abubakar—who is also Sule Garo's father-in-law—before himself being accused of later assaulting a journalist by the Nigeria Union of Journalists' state chapter. As the controversy developed, the first public poll of the race—conducted by NOI Polls and commissioned by the Anap Foundation—was released on 7 November with it showing a lead for Yusuf with Gawuna in second place and Wali in distant third place. Later that month, Ganduje and other APC leaders claimed that they had reconciled Doguwa and Garo but analysts reiterated the harm to the party from crisis, especially when coupled with Ganduje's wider unpopularity due to renewed nepotism and the criticized imprisonment of TikTok creators that posted a comedy skit about Ganduje.

In early December, focus shifted to electoral violence due to a series of clashes between APC and NNPP supporters. Both parties accused the other side of escalating tension, organizing attacks, and inciting violence. Later that month, the PDP crisis returned to the forefront as a court ruling awarded the nomination back to Abacha; Wali vowed to appeal the judgment. In the new year, BBC Hausa organized a debate on 14 January 2023 and invited Abacha, Gawuna, Ibrahim Sharada, and Yusuf in addition to PRP nominee Salihu Tanko Yakasai to participate. Held at the Dangote Business School of the Bayero University, the debate touched on topics ranging from education to security. A few days later, seven candidates signed a peace accord at an event organised by the Kano Peace Committee in collaboration with the National Peace Committee, United Nations, and the Kukah Centre; notably, Gawuna was absent but represented by Sule Garo. 

Amid further fora and rallies, analysts reiterated that the gubernatorial election was effectively a proxy battle between Ganduje, Kwankwaso, and Shekarau. One of the fora, a Media Trust debate on 4 February moderated by Daily Trust journalist Suleiman Suleiman, focused on several topics including agriculture, education, housing, social policy, transportation, unemployment, and water management. Amidst the conclusion of campaigning in February, the PDP nomination dispute continued when a Court of Appeal returned the nomination to Wali. Later that month, attention largely switched to the presidential election on 25 February. In the election, Kano State voted for Kwankwaso (NNPP); Kwankwaso won with 58.6% of the vote, beating Bola Tinubu (APC) at 30.4 and Atiku Abubakar (PDP) at 7.7%. Although the result was unsurprising as Kano is Kwankwaso's home state and projections had favored him, the totals led to increased attention on the gubernatorial race due to Kwankwaso's large margin of victory. Gubernatorial campaign analysis in the wake of the presidential election focused on the NNPP's momentum from its successful presidential and legislative campaigns in the state while noting Wali's slim chances and the power of APC incumbency. Reports also examined the highly contentious final stretch of campaigning between the APC and NNPP, with tensions and fear of violence heightened in the wake of several deadly clashes on and around the federal election date.

Election debates

Polling

Projections

Conduct

Electoral timetable

General election

Results

By senatorial district 
The results of the election by senatorial district.

By federal constituency
The results of the election by federal constituency.

By local government area 
The results of the election by local government area.

See also 
 2023 Nigerian elections
 2023 Nigerian gubernatorial elections

Notes

References 

Kano State gubernatorial election
2023
2023 Kano State elections
Kano